Jade Tree International, Inc. is an independent record label formed by Darren Walters and Tim Owen in 1990 in Wilmington, Delaware.

History

Origin (1987–1990)
In 1987, Tim Owen and Darren Walters were introduced during a punk show in Washington, D.C. 

At the time, Walters was a student at the University of Delaware where he had already independently released records on his label, Hi-Impact Records. To further these musical pursuits, Darren teamed up with Rochester Institute of Technology student Tim Owen, and his friend Carl Hedgepath. Together, they created their own label, Axtion Packed Records. 

Both Axtion Packed and Hi-Impact focused on straight edge hardcore and produced vinyl records in 45 format. 

In an effort to expand musical genres and format, Axtion Packed Records was dissolved in 1990 to form Jade Tree Records. Owens and Walters modeled their new label on established independent's Touch & Go out of Chicago and Washington, D.C.'s Dischord Records.

Growth and becoming established (1991–1996)
In August of 1991, Jade Tree made their inaugural release, Culture Shock by the hardcore band Four Walls Falling. The album art included original photography by Owens. 

The new label started with many post-hardcore and noise rock bands, though these bands didn't garner much interest from the public. It wasn't until 1993, when Jade Tree released the album Pull No Punches by DC area hardcore band, Swiz, did the label start receiving recognition. 

The label began incorporating emo, punk, melodic hardcore, and experimental groups into their line-up. Through college, they grew the label into a stable roster by 1995.

By 1994, Jade Tree was becoming less of a priority to the two founders. Owen had moved to New York City to attend the School Of Visual Arts to further his photography education. Walters remained in their native Delaware, where he worked in education, focusing on disadvantaged students. A newfound interest was once again sparked, when the pair heard an unreleased demo by the band LIfetime. By the fall of 1995, the band had officially signed with Jade Tree, and together they released the album Hello Bastards. This album would serve as the turning point for Jade Tree. 

In 1996, sales started to increase after the label released The Promise Ring's 30° Everywhere.  The label often used the graphic designers Jason Gnewikow and Jeremy Dean for many releases.

Middle years (1997–2008)
Bands signed by Jade Tree have released albums which saw regular radio play, including Alkaline Trio, Pedro the Lion, Jets to Brazil, and Joan of Arc.

Downsizing (2009–2013)
When key distributor Touch and Go Records downsized in 2009 Jade Tree scaled down too. This led to a lessening of the frequency of new releases from the label.

Digital release and regrowth (2014–2016)
Jade Tree made its entire discography available for digital download and streaming on Bandcamp in June 2014. This marked a planned increase in the number of new releases.

In February 2015, the label signed the band Dogs on Acid.

Epitaph purchase (2017–present)

In 2017 Epitaph Records purchased Jade Tree's entire catalog and started to re-release the back catalogue on vinyl.

Bands signed 

 Alkaline Trio
 Avail 
 Breather Resist
 Cap'n Jazz
 Cex
 Cloak/Dagger
 Cub Country
 Damnation AD
 Dark Blue
 Denali
 Despistado
 Dogs on Acid
 Edsel
 Eggs
 Eidolon
 Ester Drang
 Euphone
 The Explosion
 Four Walls Falling
 From Ashes Rise
 Fucked Up
 Girls Against Boys
 Gravel
 Jets to Brazil
 Joan of Arc
 Jones Very
 Juno
 Kid Dynamite
 Leslie
 Lifetime
 Lords
 Leather
 The Loved Ones
 Micah P. Hinson
 Mighty Flashlight
 Milemarker
 New End Original
 New Mexican Disaster Squad
 The New Old Hopes
 Onelinedrawing
 Owls
 Paint It Black
 Panda & Angel
 Pedro the Lion
 Pitchblende
 The Promise Ring
 Railhed
 Snowden
 Spraynard
 State of the Nation
 Statistics
 Strike Anywhere
 Sweetbelly Freakdown
 Swiz
 Texas Is The Reason
 These Arms Are Snakes
 Trial By Fire
 Turing Machine
 Turning Point
 Universal Order of Armageddon
 Walleye
 Young Widows

See also
List of record labels
Music of Delaware

References

External links
Jade Tree official web site
Jade Tree MySpace page

Record labels established in 1990
American independent record labels
Post-hardcore record labels
Emo
Hardcore record labels
Alternative rock record labels
Companies based in Wilmington, Delaware
Punk record labels
Jade Tree (record label)
1990 establishments in Delaware